The 2000 WDF Europe Cup was the 12th edition of the WDF Europe Cup darts tournament, organised by the World Darts Federation. It was held in Veldhoven, Netherlands from 10 Aug-12 Aug.



Entered teams

22 countries/associations entered a men's selection in the event.

19 countries/associations entered a womans's selection in the event.

Men's singles

Men's Pairs

Men's team
Round Robin 

Group A

 Wales 9 - 4  Germany
 Wales 9 - 2  Isle of Man
 Germany 9 - 3  Isle of Man

Group B

 Norway 9 - 8  Italy

Group C

 Belgium 9 - 4  Austria 
 Belgium 9 - 8  France         
 Austria 9 - 5  France

Group D

 Netherlands 9 - 2  Greece
 Netherlands 9 - 1  Cyprus  
 Greece 9 - 4  Cyprus

Group E

 England 9 - 5  Ireland
 England 9 - 1  Switzerland
 Ireland 9 - 8  Switzerland

Group F

 Denmark 9 - 3  Malta

Group G

 Northern Ireland 9 - 6  Hungary

Group H

 Finland 9 - 3  Scotland
 Scotland 9 - 2  Sweden
 Sweden 9 - 5  Finland

Knock Out

Woman's singles

Woman's Pairs
Round Robin 

Group A

 Olive McIntyre & Sandra O'Flaherty 4 - 3  Apylee Jones & Trina Gulliver
 Olive McIntyre & Sandra O'Flaherty 4 - 3  Ann-Louise Peters & Annette Hakonsen
 Olive McIntyre & Sandra O'Flaherty 4 - 0  Maria Poulidou & Polita Varouxi
 Olive McIntyre & Sandra O'Flaherty 4 - 3  Linda Jordon & Margaret Kelly
 Apylee Jones & Trina Gulliver 4 - 0  Ann-Louise Peters & Annette Hakonsen
 Apylee Jones & Trina Gulliver 4 - 1  Maria Poulidou & Polita Varouxi
 Apylee Jones & Trina Gulliver 4 - 0  Linda Jordon & Margaret Kelly
 Ann-Louise Peters & Annette Hakonsen 4 - 2  Maria Poulidou & Polita Varouxi
 Ann-Louise Peters & Annette Hakonsen 4 - 0  Linda Jordon & Margaret Kelly
 Maria Poulidou & Polita Varouxi 4 - 0  Linda Jordon & Margaret Kelly
Group B

 Linda Rogers-Pickett & Sandra Greatbatch 4 - 1  Vicky Pruim & Sandra Pollet
 Linda Rogers-Pickett & Sandra Greatbatch 4 - 1  Carina Ekberg & Kristina Korpii
 Karin Krappen & Francis Hoenselaar 4 - 1  Linda Rogers-Pickett & Sandra Greatbatch
 Karin Krappen & Francis Hoenselaar 4 - 3  Vicky Pruim & Sandra Pollet
 Vicky Pruim & Sandra Pollet 4 - 0  Carina Ekberg & Kristina Korpii
 Carina Ekberg & Kristina Korpii 4 - 2  Karin Krappen & Francis Hoenselaar

Group C

 Denise Cassidy & Norma Irvine 4 - 2  Tove Vestrum & Karin Nordahl  
 Denise Cassidy & Norma Irvine 4 - 0  Mojca Humar & Sonia Moretti
 Denise Cassidy & Norma Irvine 4 - 0  Gerlinde Hristovski & Monika Schartner 
 Tove Vestrum & Karin Nordahl 4 - 2  Bianka Strauch & Heike Ernst    
 Tove Vestrum & Karin Nordahl 4 - 2  Mojca Humar & Sonia Moretti 
 Tove Vestrum & Karin Nordahl 4 - 1  Gerlinde Hristovski & Monika Schartner
 Bianka Strauch & Heike Ernst 4 - 2  Denise Cassidy & Norma Irvine
 Bianka Strauch & Heike Ernst 4 - 3  Mojca Humar & Sonia Moretti
 Bianka Strauch & Heike Ernst 4 - 1  Gerlinde Hristovski & Monika Schartner     
 Mojca Humar & Sonia Moretti 4 - 2  Gerlinde Hristovski & Monika Schartner
Group D

 Anne Kirk & Jackie Sharpe 4 - 1  Nora Kautzky & Marene Racz
 Anne Kirk & Jackie Sharpe 4 - 0  Sabine Beutler & Lisa Huber
 Anne Kirk & Jackie Sharpe 4 - 1  Anita Chausson & Cathrine Robin  
 Satu Ikonen & Tarja Salminen 4 - 3  Anne Kirk & Jackie Sharpe
 Satu Ikonen & Tarja Salminen 4 - 2  Sabine Beutler & Lisa Huber 
 Satu Ikonen & Tarja Salminen 4 - 0  Anita Chausson & Cathrine Robin
 Nora Kautzky & Marene Racz 4 - 0  Satu Ikonen & Tarja Salminen
 Nora Kautzky & Marene Racz 4 - 3  Anita Chausson & Cathrine Robin
 Sabine Beutler & Lisa Huber 4 - 3  Nora Kautzky & Marene Racz   
 Anita Chausson & Cathrine Robin 4 - 3  Sabine Beutler & Lisa Huber

Knock Out

References

Darts tournaments